The 2nd International Emmy Awards took place on November 25, 1974, at the Plaza Hotel in New York City, United States. The award ceremony, presented by the International Academy of Television Arts and Sciences, honors all programming produced and originally aired outside the United States.

Ceremony 
The first ceremonies of the International Emmy Awards, had only two categories, Fiction and Non-fiction, and were won in most part by United Kingdom productions and Canada. Over the following years, new categories were added in the competition, covering a larger number of competitors from different countries.

Winners  
 Directorate Award - Joseph V. Charyk (won)

References 

International Emmy Awards ceremonies
International
International